The 2018 Women's Herald Sun Tour presented by Let's Go Motorhomes was a women's cycle stage race held in Australia from 30 to 31 January 2018. The 2018 edition was the inaugural edition of the race.

The race was won by Brodie Chapman, riding for an Australian national team. Chapman soloed to victory in the opening stage, before maintaining her lead in the following day's time trial, won by world champion Annemiek van Vleuten. Van Vleuten finished second overall, five seconds down on Chapman, while the podium was completed by Chloe Hosking, 63 seconds behind for the  team. Chapman won the mountains classification, Hosking was the winner of the sprints classification, while the Australian national team won the teams classification. Jeanne Korevaar of  won the other jersey, the white jersey, as winner of the young rider classification for under-23 riders.

Teams
16 teams participated in the 2018 Women's Herald Sun Tour.

Route
The race route was announced on 6 December 2017.

Stages

Stage 1
30 January 2018 — Healesville to Healesville,

Stage 2
31 January 2018 — Alexandra Gardens to Southbank, individual time trial (ITT)

Classification leadership table

References

External links

2018 in Australian sport
January 2018 sports events in Australia
2018 in women's road cycling